Clube de Regatas Flamengo, commonly known as Flamengo, were a Brazilian football team from Porto Velho, Rondônia. They won the Campeonato Rondoniense ten times.

History
They were founded on November 15, 1955. They won the state championship in 1956, 1960, 1961, 1962, 1965, 1966, 1967, 1982, 1983, and in 1985. Flamengo competed three times in the state championship after their professionalization, in 1991, in 1992 and in 1994, when the club folded after finishing in the third position in the league.

Stadium
Flamengo played their home games at Estádio Aluízio Ferreira. The stadium has a maximum capacity of 7,000 people.

Achievements

 Campeonato Rondoniense:
 Winners (10): 1956, 1960, 1961, 1962, 1965, 1966, 1967, 1982, 1983, 1985

References

Defunct football clubs in Rondônia
Association football clubs established in 1955
Association football clubs disestablished in 1994
1955 establishments in Brazil
1994 disestablishments in Brazil